Lan Yu (died 1393) was a Chinese military general and politician in the early Ming dynasty. His ancestral home was in present-day Dingyuan County, Anhui. In 1393, Lan Yu was accused of treason and plotting a rebellion and was executed by Zhu Yuanzhang. About 15,000 people were implicated in the case and executed by Zhu as part of the Four Major Cases of the early Ming dynasty.

Biography
According to the History of Ming, in his early years, Lan Yu was a subordinate of Chang Yuchun, another general under the rebel leader Zhu Yuanzhang (later the Hongwu Emperor of the Ming). Lan Yu was also the younger brother of Chang Yuchun's wife. As Lan Yu displayed courage in battle, Chang Yuchun spoke well of him numerous times in front of Zhu Yuanzhang, and Lan was later promoted from guanjun zhenfu to an administrative officer in the commander-in-chief's office. In 1371, Lan Yu followed Fu Youde to attack Shu (covering present-day Sichuan) and conquered Mianzhou around present-day Mianyang. In 1372, he accompanied Xu Da on a campaign against the Northern Yuan Dynasty in Mongolia, departing from Yanmen Pass and defeating the Yuan armies at Mount Luan and near the Tula River. Seven years later he followed Mu Ying to attack Tibet, capturing three tribal leaders and around a thousand men. For his efforts, in 1379, Lan Yu was conferred the title of "Marquis of Yongchang", in addition to receiving 2500 dan of grain and a shiquan, a type of plaque granted by the emperor to officials in recognition of their contributions.

In 1381, Lan Yu was appointed "Left Deputy General Who Conquers the South" and accompanied Fu Youde to attack Yunnan and pacify the region. He was rewarded with 500 dan of grain and his daughter was granted the title of "Princess Consort of Shu". In 1387, Nahachu of the Northern Yuan invaded Liaodong and the Hongwu Emperor sent Feng Sheng, with Lan Yu and Fu Youde as his right and left deputies respectively, along with a 200,000-man army to attack him. Nahachu was defeated and surrendered. Lan Yu garrisoned the army at Jizhou.

In 1388, the Hongwu Emperor commissioned Lan Yu as General-in-Chief and sent him with 150,000 troops to attack the Northern Yuan ruler Uskhal Khan. In the fourth lunar month of that year, Lan Yu's force arrived at Buir Lake and defeated the Northern Yuan army, capturing Uskhal Khan's family members numbering more than 100, more than 77,000 civilians, more than 150,000 livestock, along with several priced items, including Uskhal Khan's imperial seals. Uskhal Khan attempted to flee to the Mongol Empire's old capital of Karakorum, but was killed shortly after the defeat. The Hongwu Emperor was pleased when he received news of Lan Yu's victory and intended to grant Lan the title of "Duke of Liang", but changed the Chinese character for "Liang" from "梁" to "涼" after he heard that Lan seized a Mongol noble lady for himself and violated her. This resulted in a change in the area that was to be Lan Yu's dukedom. Despite so, Hongwu still praised Lan Yu as "comparable to Wei Qing of the Han Dynasty". 

In 1392 a surrendered Yuan general Yuelutiemu'er rebelled in Jianchang (present-day Xichang, Liangshan Yi Autonomous Prefecture, Sichuan) and Lan Yu was sent to suppress the revolt. Lan Yu crushed the uprising and captured Yuelutiemu'er and his son, and was appointed as the Crown Prince's Tutor for his achievement.

As he made more achievements, Lan Yu became more arrogant, self-indulgent and unbridled. He started abusing his power and status and behaved violently and recklessly, sometimes even showing disrespect towards the emperor. Once, after he seized land from peasants in Dongchang, an official questioned him on his actions, but Lan Yu drove the official away in anger. In another incident, after Lan Yu returned from a campaign in the north, he arrived at Xifeng Pass, where the guards denied him entry as it was already late at night, but Lan led his men to force his way through. When he was away at war, Lan Yu sometimes also demoted officers at his own will and defied orders, to the extent of going to battle without permission. During his appointment as the Crown Prince's Tutor, Lan Yu was unhappy that his post was lower than the dukes of Song and Ying, so he exclaimed, "Am I not fit to be the Imperial Tutor (太師)?" The Hongwu Emperor became more angry with Lan Yu after learning of these incidents.

Lan Yu had a close friendship with the crown prince Zhu Biao. Once after Lan Yu returned from a campaign against the Mongols, he warned the crown prince that Zhu Di (the Prince of Yan and future Yongle Emperor) seemed to be a likely a threat to his succession. Zhu Di heard about this, so after Zhu Biao died in 1392, he cautioned the Hongwu Emperor that Lan Yu and other founding pioneers of the dynasty were becoming a threat to the throne and should be dealt with before they get out of control. Lan Yu and others did not restrain themselves and continued behaving in the same manner as they did. Around this time, Hongwu was already making plans to eliminate them. Five months later when Hongwu appointed Zhu Biao's son Zhu Yunwen (future Jianwen Emperor) as the new crown prince, he allowed Lan Yu to continue serving as the Crown Prince's Tutor.

Death
In the second lunar month of 1393, a Jinyiwei (secret police) commander Jiang Huan accused Lan Yu of plotting a rebellion and a search was conducted in Lan's residence and around 10,000 Japanese swords were found. The Hongwu Emperor immediately had Lan Yu put to death on a charge of treason. Lan Yu's clan was exterminated to the third degree and his properties confiscated. More than 15,000 people were implicated and executed in this incident, including 12 marquises and two counts. This incident is known historically as the Lan Yu Case. It was believed that Hongwu Emperor orchestrated his death to eliminate any threat for his successor Zhu Yunwen; ironically, Lan Yu's death contributed greatly to Zhu Yunwen's downfall as after his death, there were no capable generals that could prevent the powerful Zhu Di (future Yongle Emperor) from usurping the throne after Hongwu Emperor's death.

See also
Ming campaign against the Uriankhai
Four Major Cases of the early Ming dynasty

Notes

References

Citations

Bibliography
Zhang Tingyu et al. History of Ming, Volume 132, Biography of Lan Yu.

1393 deaths
14th-century executions
Chinese Muslim generals
Executed Ming dynasty people
Executed people from Anhui
Generals from Anhui
Ming dynasty generals
Ming dynasty politicians
People executed by the Ming dynasty
Politicians from Chuzhou
Victims of familial execution
Yuan dynasty people
Year of birth unknown